Wild Side is a 2004 drama film directed by Sébastien Lifshitz and starring Stéphanie Michelini, Yasmine Belmadi, and Edouard Nikitine. It premiered at the 2004 Berlin International Film Festival.

Plot
Stéphanie, a transgender sex worker (Stéphanie Michelini) travels from Paris to a small town to care for her sick mother. She is joined by her two flatmates, an Algerian hustler, Jamal and a Russian soldier on AWOL, Mikhail. Both men fall in love with Stéphanie and she decides to have a relationship with them both.

Cast
 Stéphanie Michelini as Stéphanie
 Yasmine Belmadi as Djamel
 Edouard Nikitine as Mikhail
 Josiane Stoléru as the mother
 Aurélie Guichard
 Anohni as the singer
 Liliane Nataf
 Christophe Sermet as Nicolas

Awards
In 2004 Wild Side won two awards, including the Teddy Award, at the Berlin Film Festival, the Special Jury Award at the Gijón International Film Festival, the Grand Jury Award at L.A. Outfest and the New Director's Showcase Award at the Seattle International Film Festival.

Reception
Wild Side has received positive reviews from critics. On Rotten Tomatoes the film has an approval rating of 63% based on reviews from 16 critics.

Russell Edwards of Variety stated, "A morbid and self-important homosexual Jules & Jim for the new millennium", "intention to shock is unmistakable" and "narrative-time shuffles only disrupt the flow". V.A. Musetto of the New York Post on 10 June 2005, noted "Viewers are either going to walk out after 10 minutes or, like this tolerant critic, get caught up in the sordid lives of the three misfits and stick around for the ambiguous ending".
Chris reviewing for eyeforfilm.co.uk on 7 April 2008 noted it is "beautifully photographed" and has "typically unpretentious French acting". Timeout states the film follows a "non-linear tapestry" and it is "a meditative tone-poem on society’s marginals".

Todd W. Reeser wrote in Studies in French Cinema in 2007 about the film's complex narrative.

References

External links
 
 
 Page at Wellspring Media

2004 films
Bisexuality-related films
2004 drama films
2000s English-language films
British LGBT-related films
French LGBT-related films
2000s French-language films
2000s Russian-language films
Films about trans women
British multilingual films
French multilingual films
British drama films
LGBT-related drama films
Films directed by Sébastien Lifshitz
Films scored by Jocelyn Pook
2004 LGBT-related films
Belgian LGBT-related films
2004 multilingual films
2000s British films
2000s French films